Ceylonosticta mojca is a species of damselfly in the family Platystictidae, endemic to Sri Lanka.

References

 List of odonates of Sri Lanka

Damselflies of Sri Lanka
Insects described in 2010